Kelvin Kong Hok-lai is an official in the National Security Division of the Hong Kong Police Force.

Sanctions 
On 15 January 2021, Kong was sanctioned by the United States under Executive Order 13936 for his role in implementing the National Security Law.

Less than a month after being sanctioned, Kong paid off his mortgages at The RiverPark in Sha Tin.

References

Living people
Hong Kong police officers
Year of birth missing (living people)
Individuals sanctioned by the United States under the Hong Kong Autonomy Act
Specially Designated Nationals and Blocked Persons List